The little Nepalese horseshoe bat (Rhinolophus subbadius) is a species of bat in the family Rhinolophidae. It is found in Bangladesh, China, India, Myanmar and Nepal, possibly in Bhutan.

References

Rhinolophidae
Bats of Asia
Bats of South Asia
Bats of Southeast Asia
Bats of India
Mammals of Myanmar
Mammals of Bangladesh
Mammals of China
Mammals of Nepal
Mammals described in 1844
Taxonomy articles created by Polbot
Taxa named by Edward Blyth